Passive speaker(s) can refer to:
 A type of loudspeaker
 Passive speaker (language), a person who can understand but not speak a language